The Goodson Baronetcy, of Waddeton Court, Parish Court, in the Parish of Stoke Gabriel in the County of Devon, is a title in the Baronetage of the United Kingdom. It was created on 18 January 1922 for Alfred Goodson.

Goodson baronets, of Waddeton Court (1922)
Sir Alfred Lassam Goodson, 1st Baronet (1867–1940)
Sir Alfred Lassam Goodson, 2nd Baronet (1893–1986)
Sir Mark Weston Lassam Goodson, 3rd Baronet (1925–2015)
Sir Alan Reginald Goodson, 4th Baronet (b. 1960)

References

Kidd, Charles, Williamson, David (editors). Debrett's Peerage and Baronetage (1990 edition). New York: St Martin's Press, 1990.

Goodson